The city of Ottawa, Canada held municipal elections on December 5, 1932.

Mayor of Ottawa

Ottawa Board of Control
(4 elected)

Ottawa City Council
(2 elected from each ward)

References

Ottawa Citizen, December 6, 1932

Municipal elections in Ottawa
1930s in Ottawa
1932 Ontario municipal elections
December 1932 events